Afuera Islands, also known as Penguin Island or Dodge Rocks, are a group of three small islands lying north of Challenger Island and just outside the south entrance point to Hughes Bay, off the west coast of Graham Land. First charted by the French Antarctic Expedition, 1908–10, under Jean-Baptiste Charcot. The name, which appears on an Argentine government chart of 1957, is probably descriptive of the islands' location; "Afuera" means outer or outside.

See also 
 List of Antarctic and sub-Antarctic islands

Islands of Graham Land
Danco Coast